Submental (below the chin) can refer to:

 Submental artery, a branch of the facial artery
 Submental triangle, a division of the anterior triangle of the neck
 Submental lymph nodes